The 2019 FIBA 3x3 Asia Cup is the fourth edition of the FIBA Asia 3X3 Cup. The games of the final tournament will be held in Changsha, China between 24 May and 26 May 2019.

Players

Main tournament

Preliminary round

Group A

Group B

Group C

Group D

Knockout round

Final rankings

References

External links
Official website

3x3 Asia Cup
International basketball competitions hosted by China
Asia Cup
FIBA 3x3 Asia Cup